Silvano Bertini (27 March 1940 – 27 June 2021) was an Italian boxer. As an amateur he won a silver medal at the 1963 European Championships and a bronze at the 1964 Summer Olympics in Tokyo. In 1965 he turned professional and was undefeated in his first 28 fights before losing to Jean Josselin in 1969.  He retired in 1973 after failing to come out for the bell in the 12th round against Koichi Wajima for the WBA and WBC super-welterweight titles.

Bertini died on 27 June 2021, aged 81.

References

1940 births
2021 deaths
Welterweight boxers
Light-middleweight boxers
Boxers at the 1964 Summer Olympics
Olympic boxers of Italy
Olympic bronze medalists for Italy
Olympic medalists in boxing
People from Signa
Italian male boxers
Medalists at the 1964 Summer Olympics
European Boxing Union champions
Sportspeople from the Metropolitan City of Florence
Mediterranean Games gold medalists for Italy
Mediterranean Games medalists in boxing
20th-century Italian people
21st-century Italian people